is a Japanese football player for Veertien Mie.

Career
After attending Osaka University of Health and Sport Sciences, Ota joined Grulla Morioka in January 2018.

Club statistics
Updated to February 2nd, 2020.

References

External links

Profile at J. League
Profile at Iwate Grulla Morioka

1995 births
Living people
Osaka University of Health and Sport Sciences alumni
Association football people from Kanagawa Prefecture
Japanese footballers
J3 League players
Japan Football League players
Iwate Grulla Morioka players
Veertien Mie players
Association football defenders